Extreme Pizza is a privately held restaurant franchise chain specializing in conventional and California-style pizza, founded by Todd Parent and Michael Pastor in 1994 in San Francisco, California.  The chain currently includes over 30 locations in the United States; a previous location in Ireland has now closed.  24 franchises are located in Central California.  Others are present in Portland, Oregon; Boise, Idaho; McAllen, Texas; Clearwater Beach, Florida; Grosse Pointe, Michigan; Wantage, New Jersey; and Charlottesville and Henrico, Virginia.  Entrepreneur Ernest Harris has recently brought the franchise to Northern Virginia, opening locations in Pentagon City and Arlington County. The company primarily sells pizza; other menu items include calzones, sandwiches, and salads.

Description

Most West Coast restaurants have decor of extreme sports, such as photographs of extreme athletes and benches made out of snowboards. In keeping with its extreme sports theme, Extreme Pizza was an early sponsor of the X Games.  According to the Seattle Times, Extreme Pizza is "lauded within the business world for its enlightened corporate policies and savvy extreme-sports sponsorships".

See also
 List of pizza chains of the United States

References

External links
 

Cuisine of the Western United States
Economy of the Western United States
Regional restaurant chains in the United States
Pizza chains of the United States
Pizza franchises
Restaurants established in 1994
1994 establishments in California
Restaurants in San Francisco
Privately held companies based in California
American companies established in 1994